Saint Lucia competed at the 2018 Commonwealth Games in the Gold Coast, Australia from April 4 to April 15, 2018.

The Saint Lucia team consisted of 13 athletes (10 men and 3 women) that competed in three sports.

Medalists

Competitors
The following is the list of number of competitors participating at the Games per sport/discipline.

Athletics

Saint Lucia participated with 8 athletes (6 men and 2 women).

Men
Track & road events

Field events

Women
Field events

Boxing

Saint Lucia participated with a team of 3 athletes (3 men)

Men

Swimming

Saint Lucia participated with 2 athletes (1 man and 1 woman).

See also
Saint Lucia at the 2018 Summer Youth Olympics

References

Nations at the 2018 Commonwealth Games
Saint Lucia at the Commonwealth Games
Common